Silvertomb is an American doom metal band composed of Type O Negative members Kenny Hickey and Johnny Kelly, as well as Hank Hell of Inhuman, Joseph James of Agnostic Front and Aaron Joos of Empyreon. Following the dissolution of Hickey's previous band Seventh Void in 2017, Silvertomb was formed.

The band has played various songs live since their initial formation, though it was not until November 1, 2019, that their first full-length album, Edge of Existence, was released.

Band members
Kenny Hickey – lead vocals, lead guitar
Hank Hell – bass guitar
Johnny Kelly – drums
Joseph James – guitar
Aaron Joos – keyboards and guitars

Discography 
 Edge of Existence (2019)

References

External links
Official band website

Heavy metal musical groups from New York (state)
Musical groups from Brooklyn
Musical groups established in 2017
2017 establishments in New York City